Daniel Grahame Bartlett (born 13 October 2000) is an English professional footballer who plays as a midfielder for Championship club Coventry City.

Career
Bartlett started his career in the youth system at Southampton before making a move to Coventry City prior to the 2019–20 season. Bartlett made his debut in an EFL Trophy game against Walsall.

Not long into his Coventry City career he was ruled out with a serious knee injury suffered in an under-23s game.

On 12 May 2021 it was announced that he would leave Coventry at the end of the season, following the expiry of his contract.

Career statistics

References

External links
 Dan Bartlett player profile at ccfc.co.uk
 
 

2000 births
Living people
Sportspeople from Poole
Footballers from Dorset
English footballers
Association football midfielders
Coventry City F.C. players